The Nottingham and Nottinghamshire Bank was a joint stock bank which operated from its headquarters in Nottingham from 1834 to 1919.

History
It was established in Nottingham as the Nottingham & Nottinghamshire Banking Company. The initial capital was £500,000. The bank began trading in Pelham Street in central Nottingham on 19 April 1834 under the management of Peter Watt, a Scottish banker. By the 1840s the bank's London agents were the London and Westminster Bank.

In 1841 the bank ran into difficulty but shareholders injected money and it survived.

A new head office building was constructed in Nottingham on Thurland Street in 1881. It was built to the designs of the architect Watson Fothergill.

In 1884 the bank assumed limited liability as Nottingham & Nottinghamshire Banking Co Ltd with a capital of £1.3 million.

In 1891 the bank suffered an embarrassment when it was revealed that the manager of the Newark branch, Robert James Beard, had defrauded the bank of £25,000 before drowning himself in the River Trent. The bank covered the loss from its reserves.

It was acquired by the London, County, Westminster & Parr's Bank in 1919.

Branches
The bank opened around 39 branches and sub-branches. In 1919, 20 branches and 18 sub-branches were operating. The following were the locations of the branches:

References

Buildings and structures in Nottingham
Banks established in 1834
Defunct banks of the United Kingdom
Companies based in Nottingham
Banks disestablished in 1919
History of Nottingham
1834 establishments in England